Reginald Joseph Partridge (11 February 1912 – 1 February 1997) was an English cricketer active from 1929 to 1948 who played for Northamptonshire (Northants). He appeared in 280 first-class matches as a righthanded batsman who bowled right arm medium pace, off break and leg break. Partridge was born in Wollaston, Northamptonshire on 11 February 1912 and died in Northampton on 1 February 1997. He scored 3,922 runs with a highest score of 70 and took 638 wickets with a best performance of nine for 66.

References

1912 births
1997 deaths
English cricketers
Northamptonshire cricketers
Royal Air Force cricketers
North v South cricketers
M. Leyland's XI cricketers